Keoney Demicoli (born 2 October 1997) is a Maltese footballer who plays as a goalkeeper for First Division club Hibernians FC. She has been a member of the Malta women's national team.

References

1997 births
Living people
Women's association football goalkeepers
Maltese women's footballers
Malta women's international footballers
Hibernians F.C. players